Iselica  is a genus of small sea snails, marine heterobranch gastropod molluscs or micromolluscs in the family Amathinidae.

Species 
Species within the genus Iselica include:
 Iselica alta Poppe, Tagaro & Goto, 2018
 Iselica carotica Marincovich, 1973
 Iselica chilensis Marincovich, 1973
 Iselica fenestrata (Carpenter, 1864)
 Iselica globosa (H. C. Lea, 1843)
 Iselica kochi A. M. Strong & Hertlein, 1939
 Iselica maculosa (Carpenter, 1857)
 Iselica obtusa (Carpenter, 1864)
 Iselica ovoidea (Gould, 1853)
Species brought into synonymy
 Iselica altum Poppe, Tagaro & Goto, 2018: synonym of Iselica alta Poppe, Tagaro & Goto, 2018 (incorrect gender agreement of specific epithet)
 Iselica anomala (C. B. Adams, 1850): synonym of Iselica globosa (H. C. Lea, 1843)
 Iselica laxa Dall, 1919: synonym of Iselica obtusa (Carpenter, 1864)

References

New marine species from the central Philippines. Visaya 5(1): 91-135

External links
 

Amathinidae
Gastropod genera